The Rivulidae are a family of killifishes in the order Cyprinodontiformes. They are commonly known as rivulids, South American killifish or New World killifish. The latter names are slightly misleading, however, as they are neither restricted to South America – though most are in fact found there –, nor are they the only killifishes from the Americas. Occasionally, they are still referred to as rivulines, a term dating back to when they were considered a subfamily of the Aplocheilidae.

The subfamilial name "Rivulinae" was already established for noctuid moths by Augustus Radcliffe Grote in 1895. That name, though it is the senior homonym, may be suppressed because the name Rivulinae for the fish subfamily is widespread, whereas the moth taxon is little used. The use of Rivulidae as the name for this family may need to be ruled in by the International Commission on Zoological Nomenclature. The alternative family-group name Cynolebiidae Hoedeman 1961 has been proposed as an alternative to Rivulidae.

Costa unified the three families within the suborder Aplocheiloidei into a single family Aplocheilidae, with the subfamilies Aplocheilinae, Nothobranchiinae and the Cynolebiinae. However, the 5th edition of Fishes of the World retains the three families Aplocheilidae, Nothobranchiidae and Rivulidae.

Genera
The following genera are classified in the family Rivulidae: The taxonomy of this family is subject to some discussion among workers and some of the listed genera are considered to be paraphyletic, for example it has been posited that Leptolebias is paraphyletic if the species placed in Leptopanchax are retained within it, as per Fishbase.

 Anablepsoides Huber, 1992
 Aphyolebias Costa, 1998
 Atlantirivulus Costa, 2008
 Austrofundulus Myers, 1932
 Austrolebias Costa, 1998
 Campellolebias Vaz-Ferreira & Sierra de Soriano, 1974
 Cynodonichthys Meek, 1904
 Cynolebias Steindachner, 1876
 Cynopoecilus Regan, 1912
 Gnatholebias Costa, 1998
 Hypsolebias Costa, 2006
 Kryptolebias Costa, 2004
 Laimosemion Huber, 1999
 Leptolebias Myers, 1952
 Llanolebias Hrbek & Taphorn, 2008
 Maratecoara Costa, 1995
 Melanorivulus Costa, 2006
 Micromoema Costa, 1998
 Millerichthys Costa, 1995
 Moema Costa, 1989
 Mucurilebias Costa, 2014
 Nematolebias Costa, 1998
 Neofundulus Myers, 1924
 Notholebias Costa, 2008
 Ophthalmolebias Costa, 2006
 Papiliolebias Costa, 1998
 Pituna Costa, 1989
 Plesiolebias Costa, 1989
 Prorivulus Costa, Lima & Suzart, 2004
 Pterolebias Garman, 1895
 Rachovia Myers, 1927
 Renova Thomerson & Taphorn, 1995
 Rivulus Poey, 1860
 Simpsonichthys Carvalho, 1959
 Spectrolebias Costa & Nielsen, 1997
 Stenolebias Costa, 1995
 Terranatos Taphorn & Thomerson, 1978
 Trigonectes Myers, 1925
 Xenurolebias Costa, 2006

References 

 

Ray-finned fish families
Taxa named by George S. Myers